The Box Office Entertainment Awards, sometimes known as the GMMSF Box Office Entertainment Awards is an annual award ceremony held in Metro Manila and organized by Guillermo Mendoza Memorial Scholarship Foundation. The award-giving body honors stars and performers simply for their popularity and commercial success in the Philippine entertainment industry, regardless of their excellence in their particular fields.

During the first months of each year, mostly during March or April, the Guillermo Mendoza Memorial Scholarship Foundation board of jurors will deliberate for the year's winners, which will be chosen from the Top 10 Philippine films of the past year, top-rating shows in Philippine television, top recording awards received by singers, and top gross receipts of concerts and performances. The list will then be released prior to the awards night, which is held during April or May.

History
Ferdie Syquia Villar, the person who launched the "Miss Republic of the Philippines" contest, came up with the "Box Office King and Queen Awards" in 1960s, and formally launched his idea in 1970. By the late '70s, after then President Ferdinand Marcos declared Martial Law in 1972, he turned the responsibility over to Corazon Samaniego before leaving for abroad.

Corazon Samaniego, a former businesswoman in Bulacan, continued the presentation and officially inaugurated the "Guillermo Mendoza Memorial Scholarship Foundation Inc." in 1971. The organization is named after a former Bulacan town mayor and philanthropist and her late father, Guillermo Mendoza. It became an annual event, recognizing the most popular people and their works in the Philippine entertainment industry. At the end of the day, the proceeds from the television rights and gate receipts are used to send underprivileged Bulacan students to school.

Records
Vice Ganda has the most phenomenal box office star titles with six, he is also the first person to receive this award in 2012.

Sharon Cuneta has the most box office queen titles in history with 10.

Fernando Poe Jr. and Vic Sotto have the most box office king titles in history with seven.

Milestones
1960s: The first "Box Office King and Queen" was introduced by Ferdie Syquia Villar. The late Fernando "Ronnie"., Poe, Jr. and Boots Anson-Roa were actually the first recipients of the "Box Office King and Queen of Philippine Movies" title in 1968. Subsequently, Ronnie became a regular recipient of the award as if to certify that he is the "King of Philippine Movies" or "Da King"
1971: The award-giving body was officially established in the year 1971 after the turn-over. Nora Aunor won the "Box Office Queen" award for the Guillermo Mendoza Foundation.
2006: The former "Box Office King and Queen Awards" was renamed to "Box Office Entertainment Awards". Together with the name change, some categories were also altered. For example, the former "Mr. and Miss RP Movies" and "Prince and Princess of RP Movies" titles became "Film Actor and Actress of the Year" and "Prince and Princess of Philippine Movies" respectively.
2007 For the first time, there were two recipients for the "Box Office Queen". Kris Aquino and Claudine Barretto received the award for their film Sukob under Star Cinema.
2009: This was the 39th year of the annual event; however, the organization believes that 39 is an unlucky number. Thus they skipped 39 and consider this event the 40th instead.
2012: The award-giving body officially introduced a new award called "Phenomenal Box Office Star", which is given to the actor(s) whose film attains the highest-grossing film of all time in the Philippines. It was given to Vice Ganda for his fim The Unkabogable Praybeyt Benjamin, which received PHP 332M.

Award ceremonies

1The yearly event is supposed to be the 39th year, but they believe that it is an unlucky number. Thus they skipped the 39th and consider this event the 40th instead.

Merit categories

Major awards
 Phenomenal Box Office Star
 Box Office King
 Box Office Queen

Other awards

Film category

Television category

Music category

Recurring awards
 Valentine Box Office King
 Valentine Box Office Queen
 Teenage King of Philippine Movies
 Teenage Queen of Philippine Movies
 Phenomenal Box Office Child Star
 Phenomenal Box Office Tandem

Other awards
 Bert Marcelo Lifetime Achievement Award 
 Breakthrough Box Office Indie Film
 All-Time Highest Grossing Horror Film

Discontinued categories
 Stuntman of the Year 
 Female Stunt of the Year 
 All-Time Favorite Actor 
 All-Time Favorite Actress

Controversies
The following are the controversies of the award ceremonies:
1986: Maricel Soriano should have won Box-Office Queen for Batang Quiapo. Her co-star FPJ was named Box-Office King. But she was named Ms. RP for Movies instead. She didn’t attend the Awarding thus she was never awarded the Box-Office Queen ever.
2003: Many questioned Aga Muhlach's win as the "Box Office King" after the official list of winners were released. In particular, the fans of the late Rico Yan contested, saying that his last film Got 2 Believe was the highest-grossing film of the year. Although they were not personally against Muhlach, they believed that the award-giving body should give an explanation.
2006: Questions from the readers arose after the organization chose Kristine Hermosa for the "Box Office Queen" title. They argued that there were more deserving actresses to receive the title over Hermosa, who only had one film that year. Furthermore, they believed that her one and only film, Enteng Kabisote 2: Okay Ka Fairy Ko: The Legend Continues, was actually successful because of her leading man, Vic Sotto, who was the "Box Office King" of 2005. Thus, most, if not all, the credit goes to Sotto, not hers.
2008: There was speculation that Judy Ann Santos would not win any of the awards from the award-giving body anymore. Although her 2006 films Don't Give Up on Us and Kasal, Kasali, Kasalo, and the latter's sequel Sakal, Sakali, Saklolo in 2007 were all box office hits, top-grossing films in fact, she did not win any of the awards. Furthermore, not even Ryan Agoncillo, her leading man and real life partner, nor the director of the two films Joey Reyes won an award. They believed that it all started during the awards night of the 30th award ceremony in 2000 wherein "Box Office King and Queen" winners Fernando Poe Jr. and Judy Ann Santos of Isusumbong Kita sa Tatay Ko were not able to attend. Santos had a taping at that time, while FPJ does not want to be crowned without his queen. The next year, and until now, they were not able to receive any of the awards anymore, not even nominees nor special mentions despite them having box office films. They believe that the award-giving body disqualified Santos as they took her (and FPJ's) absence personally.
2011: There were reports that Bea Alonzo was a snob to Gerald Anderson during the awards night as he was linked to her before. Alonzo denied the issue, however, explaining that her seat is far from him. Since she was already a latecomer, she does not want to make a scene by going there just to get his attention.
It was also believed that there was a leakage of the winners list, saying that the "Box Office Queen" title would be given to Toni Gonzaga for her film My Amnesia Girl. However, many even speculated that Ai-Ai delas Alas would receive the title for her box office movie Ang Tanging Ina Mo (Last na 'To!). In the end, the latter received the award.
2013: There were rumors that the organization was disappointed with John Lloyd Cruz for not attending the awards night. Cruz, as the report says, promised to attend the event to receive the "Box Office King" award personally. However, he was not seen throughout the event, saying that he was sick. In contrast, the speculations point out that Cruz attended another event, instead.

See also

 List of Asian television awards

References

 
Philippine music awards
Philippine television awards
Philippine film awards